Bruno Ninaber van Eyben (born 3 November 1950) is a Dutch jewellery and industrial designer. He designed the last series of Dutch guilder coins and the obverse side of all circulating Dutch euro coins.

Personal life
Bruno Ninaber van Eyben is born on 3 November 1950 in Boxtel in the Netherlands. He currently lives in Delft.

Designer

In 1971 Bruno Ninaber van Eyben graduated cum laude from the College of Art in Maastricht as a jewellery designer. In the 1970s he designed a bracelet watch (1973), a pendant watch (1976), and a fluorescent lighting system (1977). In 1979 he received the Kho Liang Ie Award, a Dutch award for industrial design.

In 1980 he designed the last series of Dutch guilder coins, which were in circulation from 1982 until the introduction of the euro in 2002. In 1997 he started his own studio called Bruno Ninaber van Eyben design+production in Delft. In May 1998 he won the contest for the design of the reverse side of the Dutch euro coins.

Since 2003 he is professor of Design at the Delft University of Technology.

References

External links

Bruno Ninaber van Eyben design+production

1950 births
Living people
Academic staff of the Delft University of Technology
Dutch currency designers
Dutch industrial designers
People from Boxtel